The Accademia Ercolanese, in full Regale Accademia Ercolanese di Archeologia (Royal Herculaneum Academy of Archaeology), is a learned society established in Naples in 1755 by Bernardo Tanucci under the royal patronage of Charles VII of Naples with the primary purpose of studying and preserving the finds from Herculaneum and Pompeii.

References

External links
 

Learned societies of Italy
1755 establishments in Europe